Ward Glacier is a small glacier between Terminus Mountain and Howchin Glacier on the east side of the Royal Society Range in Victoria Land. Named by Taylor of the British Antarctic Expedition (1910–13) for L. Ward, a Tasmanian geologist.

Glaciers of Scott Coast